Doos may refer to the following places in Germany:

 Döös, the Low Saxon name for the town of Döse in the state of Lower Saxony
 Doos, a district in the town of Waischenfeld in the state of Bavaria
 Doos'sche Palais (Doos Palace) in Wilster in the state of Schleswig-Holstein
 Dictionary of Obscure Sorrows, abbreviated as DOOS

See also
 Van Doos, English nickname for the Royal 22nd Regiment of the Canadian Army